1929 saw the 35 teams that formed the Primera División divided into two groups. The top 2 of each group qualified for the final stages of the tournament, which was eventually won by Gimnasia y Esgrima (LP).

The season was marred by mass abandonment of games, defending Argentine champion Huracán withdrew from 8 of its fixtures leaving them to finish in 14th place in the group. Several other teams withdrew from multiple games. Abandonments of games, discontinuations, and withdrawals were quite common in these early seasons (cf., for instance, the second half of the 1930 season ).

The Argentina national team won a new edition of Copa América.

Primera División
Colegiales returned to the first division after winning the Primera B championship last year.

Group A

Group B

As Boca Juniors and San Lorenzo finished level on points, they needed a playoff to decide which team went to the final and which to the 3rd/4th place playoff.

Playoff

Third place

Final

Lower divisions

Primera B
Champion: Honor y Patria (Bernal)

Primera C
Champion: Gimnasia y Esgrima (Lanús)

Argentina national team
Argentina won its 4th. Copa América, hosted at home. The team also won other minor championships such as Copa Cámara de Diputados Argentina and Copa Centro Automovilístico Uruguayo but lost the Copa Lipton and Copa Newton to Uruguay.

Copa Lipton

Copa Newton

Copa América

References